M.A. Matin (died 13 June 2012) was a Bangladesh Jatiya Party politician and a Deputy Prime Minister of Bangladesh.

Biography
Matin founded Sirajganj Shishu Hospital and North Bengal Medical College in Sirajganj. He was the former Chairman of Bangladesh Jatiya Party.

Matin was elected to parliament from Pabna-5 as a Bangladesh Muslim League candidate in 1979. He was elected as a Member of Parliament from the then Sirajganj-7 constituency as a candidate of Jatiya Party in the 3rd Jatiya Sangsad elections on 7 May 1986 and the 4th Jatiya Sangsad on 3 March 1988. Matin was elected to parliament from Sirajganj-7 as a Bangladesh Jatiya Party candidate in 2001.

His wife Tasmina Mahmud, a notable physician, was the daughter of Abdullah al Mahmood, former Minister of Industries and Natural Resources of Pakistan, and the sister of BNP politician Iqbal Hasan Mahmud Tuku.

Matin died on 13 June 2012.

References

1930s births
2012 deaths
Bangladesh Jatiya Party politicians
Deputy Prime Ministers of Bangladesh
3rd Jatiya Sangsad members
4th Jatiya Sangsad members
8th Jatiya Sangsad members
Road Transport and Bridges ministers of Bangladesh
Place of birth missing
Date of birth missing
People from Sirajganj District